My Old Man Said (MOMS) is the name of the online publication and Aston Villa F.C. supporters' group. MOMS was formed in 2011 from the ashes of the supporter protest against the controversial appointment of Aston Villa F.C. manager Alex McLeish. The group and site takes its name from the Aston Villa supporters' song My Old Man.

An affiliated member of the Football Supporters' Federation (FSF), as a supporter's group, MOMS aims to represent Villa supporter's interests in a rational and common sense manner. MOMS is a member of the Aston Villa Fan Consultation Group that regularly meets with club officials to constructively address supporter issues.

As a website / blog, MOMS also aims to provide an original voice and provide a more supporter-slanted view of football issues. There is also a penchant for Villa nostalgia and sometimes a humorous and satirical outlook.

MOMS won the 'Best New Football Blog' award in 2012 and the judges' award for the 'Best Established Football Blog' in 2014. MOMS is a nominee in the 2016 FSF Awards.

The group was originally started by David Michael, an Aston Villa supporter and writer/journalist (inc. The Times, Sydney Morning Herald, GQ, Vogue, FHM, Rolling Stone, Filmink, The Big Issue, The Evening Standard, The Independent), who first requested the club to issue an announcement to Villa supporters to admit an interest in Alex McLeish as a potential managerial candidate, since it had at first seemed an incredulous press rumour. Michael then helped oversee the resulting peaceful protest against the appointment; liaising with fans, the club and the West Midlands Police.

While the group supported McLeish during his tenure of the club, the original fears of most Villa fans were realised when a series of poor performances ultimately left the club a whisker away from relegation and picking up some new unwelcome club records - like the worst home record in any season of Villa's long history. Alex McLeish was sacked, but at least he could claim an epitaph in inspiring the creation of a new and popular Villa supporter group.

Some of the My Old Man Said's actions
 Getting Aston Villa F.C. and Celtic F.C. fans wishes for a charity game between the two teams in honour of the club's captain Stiliyan Petrov into national and international press.
 Getting word out to Liverpool fans to join us in a 19th Minute applause for Stiliyan Petrov at Anfield on the day of their ‘Justice for the 96′ tribute. The first away game Villa had played since Petrov had been diagnosed with acute leukemia.
 Organising the 6th minute celebratory applause for Fabrice Muamba of Bolton Wanderers, when Bolton visited Villa Park, to mark his incredible recovery.
 In what The Guardian newspaper called an  ‘unprecedented step’, organised an advert which read 'We Told You So' in the local Birmingham Mail to remind the club that supporters do know something about the business of football.
 Obtained an apology from West Ham United for the Aston Villa away fans at the opening game of the 2012/13 season at the Boleyn Ground, who suffered poor catering conditions during a heat wave.
 Attended the FSF's Safe Standing Campaign visit to Parliament on 11 December 2012, that aimed to raise awareness and discussion amongst MP's.
 Formed a consortium of Villa fans 'Holte Enders in the Sun' who within a 24-hour period before the deadline of share issue, managed to make the 100+ share club of Real Oviedo shareholders, helping to raise over €1000 for the cash stricken Spanish club. Fellow shareholders include the world's richest man Carlos Slim and Real Madrid football club.
 MOMS represented Aston Villa supporters on a football supporters' march on the Premier League offices in London on 19 June 2013  in a protest over the rising cost of football.
 As one of the new directors helped relaunch and modernise the Aston Villa Supporters Trust to be a representative supporters voice.
 MOMS was present at the Football Supporters Federation march on the Premier League offices in London on 14 August 2014 
 With the club facing yet another relegation battle after a long winless run without a single goal scored and with chairman wanting to sell, MOMS joined with two other Villa fansites in issuing a joint open letter to Villa supporters to demonstrate at the Liverpool game at Villa Park on 17 January 2015. The suggestion in the open letter was for a two-part demonstration -  refraining from talking seats in the Holte End for the first eight-minutes (marking the number of years of the Lerner administration), followed by 82 minutes of non-stop support (symbolic with the club's finest hour in 1982 winning the European Cup), thus showing two potential futures for the club. The proposed demo successfully generated high-profile blanket coverage   of Villa's worrying predicament in the media for the week leading up to the game. On the actual day, the club cut the concourse live feeds of the game to flush supporters out and also refrained from using the pre-match surfer flag. A week later, the then club captain Fabian Delph surprisingly signed a new contract. Unknown to supporters at the time, the contract contained a low buy out clause, thus in hindsight it seemed like a short-term PR stunt to appease the growing discontentment amongst Villa fans highlighted by the demo and press coverage.
 My Old Man Said crowdfunded a 20m x 20m giant surfer flag for the Aston Villa vs Arsenal FA Cup Final 2015, based on the classic Sex Pistols album Never Mind the Bollocks, Here's the Sex Pistols, which was then banned by Wembley Stadium and the FA.  The ban from Wembley caused outcry in the national press with many papers questioning the decision. The Daily Mirror labelled it a 'bizarre reason.' Both Arsenal supporter groups and the Football Supporters Federation supported the flag and spoke out against Wembley and the FA's decision.
 As a gesture to the Villa supporters who helped fund the banned Wembley surfer flag, MOMS organised with Nottingham Forest to display the flag at the City Ground for Villa's pre-season fixture and then later arranged with Aston Villa for the flag to be used on the Holte End at Villa Park for the visit of Arsenal in the Premier League in December 2015.
 Organised a joint Aston Villa and Stoke City 'Twenty's Plenty' Banner Protest at Villa Park as part of the FSF's weekend of action.
 MOMS was part of the Football Supporter Federation Premier League supporter group rep think tank that helped gain the Premier League £30 away ticket price cap.

References

External links
My Old Man Said Website
My Old Man Said Facebook
My Old Man Said Twitter
My Old Man Said Instagram
My Old Man Said Podcast

Aston Villa F.C.